Ramamirtha Jayaraman (10 October 1937 – 14 April 2019) was an Indian geneticist, known for his studies on bacteria, especially on Escherichia coli. His researches on the control of transcription of bacteria are known to have evidenced the participation of accessory factors in transcription and their interactions with RNA polymerase. He was a professor at the Madurai Kamaraj University (MKU) and a former scientist at Tata Institute of Fundamental Research. Post his retirement, he served as an emeritus scientist at MKU. He authored the reference manual, Jayaraman Laboratory Manual in Molecular Genetics and several pamphlets and articles; PubMed, an online repository of medical papers has listed 59 of them. The Council of Scientific and Industrial Research, the apex agency of the Government of India for scientific research, awarded him the Shanti Swarup Bhatnagar Prize for Science and Technology, one of the highest Indian science awards, in 1982, for his contributions to biological sciences.

He died on 13 April 2019.

See also 
 T4 rII system

References 

Recipients of the Shanti Swarup Bhatnagar Award in Biological Science
1937 births
2019 deaths
Scientists from Tamil Nadu
Indian geneticists
Indian scientific authors
Madurai Kamaraj University
Academic staff of Tata Institute of Fundamental Research
20th-century Indian biologists